The Reading Festival bridge is a temporary footbridge over the River Thames near Reading, Berkshire. First built in 2008, the bridge is installed annually for the Reading Festival to allow access to the main festival site from camping and parking on the north side of the river. Use of the bridge is restricted to festival attendees.

It has permanent footings and was first erected for Reading Festival goers of 2008 for £1 million. The intention was that the deck and approaches would be dismantled and stored for most of the year, being re-erected for future festivals. It replaced a ferry service, which caused complaints over excessive queues.

The northern end of the bridge lies in the Oxfordshire civil parish of Mapledurham, on land leased from the Mapledurham Estate. Like the main festival site, the northern camp site and car park is pasture for most of the year.

For 2009, a wider bridge with improved aesthetics was built with little disruption to river traffic. Only a single two-hour river closure order was needed for installing; and the same for removing. The work was carried out at the bridge site.

See also
Crossings of the River Thames

References

Pedestrian bridges across the River Thames
Bridges completed in 2008
Bridges in Reading, Berkshire
Bridges in Oxfordshire
Reading and Leeds Festivals
August events